Cheryl Martin is an American chemist. She is currently with Harwich Partners, a consulting firm she founded to work with public and private sector entities to identify critical business, technology, finance, regulatory and policy drivers that would accelerate adoption of new technologies into key markets. Until November 2018 she was a member of the Managing Board at the World Economic Forum where she was responsible for a range of industry and innovation initiatives. Prior to joining the Forum, Martin served as Acting Director for the Advanced Research Projects Agency - Energy (ARPA-E), a United States Department of Energy initiative. In addition, she was the Deputy Director for Commercialization at the agency where she led ARPA-E's Technology-to-Market program, which helps breakthrough energy technologies succeed in the marketplace.

Biography
Cheryl Martin was raised in Massachusetts and attended the College of the Holy Cross in Worcester, Massachusetts. She then went on to earn her PhD in organic chemistry from the Massachusetts Institute of Technology. She worked for twenty years with the Rohm and Haas Company, initially as a senior scientist and eventually serving as corporate vice president in 2007. She then joined Kleiner, Perkins, Caufield & Byers as an Executive-in-Residence during which time she was also the Acting CEO for Renmatix, a company that converts biomass into cellulosic sugars.

Martin joined the U.S. Department of Energy (DOE) Initiative ARPA-E as Deputy Director for Commercialization under then-director Arun Majumdar. After Majumdar resigned from the DOE, Martin was named acting-director in his place.

References

Living people
Massachusetts Institute of Technology School of Science alumni
Obama administration personnel
United States Department of Energy
21st-century American chemists
Year of birth missing (living people)
College of the Holy Cross alumni
American women chief executives
21st-century American women